Nordsachsen ("North Saxony") is a district (Kreis) in Saxony, Germany.

History 
The district was established by merging the former districts of Delitzsch and Torgau-Oschatz as part of the district reform of August 2008.

On 10 December 2009 the district council adopted the district's new coat of arms.
“Or a lion rampant Sable armed and langued Gules between two pallets wavy Azure.”

Geography 
The district is located in the plains north and east of Leipzig. The main rivers of the district are the Mulde and the Elbe. The district borders (from the west and clockwise) the states Saxony-Anhalt and Brandenburg, the districts of Meißen, Mittelsachsen and Leipzig, and the urban district Leipzig.

Towns and municipalities 

{|
! align=left width=33%|Towns
! colspan=2 align=left width=67%|Municipalities
|- valign=top
||
Bad Düben
Belgern-Schildau
Dahlen
Delitzsch
Dommitzsch
Eilenburg
Mügeln
Oschatz
Schkeuditz
Taucha
Torgau
||
Arzberg
Beilrode
Cavertitz
Doberschütz
Dreiheide
Elsnig
Jesewitz
Krostitz
Laußig
Liebschützberg
||
Löbnitz
Mockrehna
Naundorf
Rackwitz
Schönwölkau
Trossin
Wermsdorf 
Wiedemar
Zschepplin
|}

References

External links 

  (German)